Mastercard Maestro is a brand of debit cards and prepaid cards owned by Mastercard that was introduced in 1991. Maestro is accepted at around fifteen million point of sale outlets in 93 countries. 

Starting July 1, 2023, Mastercard will phase out Maestro across Europe. European banks and other card issuers will be required to replace expired or lost Maestro cards with Debit Mastercard.

Functionality 
Maestro debit cards are obtained from associate banks and are linked to the cardholder's savings account, current account or any of several other types of accounts, while prepaid cards do not require a bank account to operate. Maestro cards can be used at point of sale (POS) and ATMs. Payments are made by swiping cards through the payment terminal, insertion into a chip and PIN device or by a contactless reader. The payment is authorized by the card issuer to ensure that the cardholder has sufficient funds in their account to make the purchase. The cardholder then confirms the payment by either signing the sales receipt or entering their 4- to 6-digit PIN, except with contactless transactions below a specified amount for which no further verification is required.

Maestro often requires on-line electronic authorization for every transaction, although Mastercard's rules permit the establishment of floor limits on Maestro EMV chip transactions only. Not only must the information stored in either the chip or the magnetic stripe be read, but this has to be sent from the merchant to the issuing bank, the issuing bank then has to respond with an affirmative authorization. If the information is not read, the issuer will decline the transaction, regardless of any disposable amount on the connected account, except in the Asia Pacific region, where manual keyed entry is permitted under some circumstances. This is different from most other debit and credit cards, where the information can be entered manually into the terminal (i.e. by typing the 13 to 19 digits and the expiry date on the terminal) and still be approved by the issuer or stand-in processor. In most countries, other than those specified in Mastercard's rules, a PIN rather than a signature is always required to authorise a Maestro transaction, except where no CVM (Cardholder Verification Method) is required.

Acceptance and availability

Americas

Asia

Europe

Logos

See also
 RuPay
ATM usage fees

References

Financial services companies established in 1991
Debit cards
Debit card issuer associations
Mastercard
Products introduced in 1991
Products and services discontinued in 2023